Lemonwood may refer to:

Plants
 Calycophyllum candidissimum (Vahl) DC. or dagame, a tree native to Central America and vicinity
 Pittosporum eugenioides A.Cunn. or tarata, a tree native to New Zealand
 Psychotria capensis (Eckl.) Vatke or bird-berry, a tree native to southern Africa
 Xymalos monospora (Harv.) Baill., a tree of the Afromontane highlands in Africa

Places
 Lemonwood, a neighborhood in Oxnard, California